India competed at the 1984 Summer Olympics in Los Angeles, United States.
India didn't win a medal but the Games are remembered for bringing Indian women athletes centre stage. 
P. T. Usha lost the bronze medal in 400 metre hurdles by one-hundredth of a second. Earlier in the Games, Shiny Abraham reached the semifinals of 800 metres with a personal best of 2:04.69 seconds and became the first Indian woman to reach the semi-finals of an Olympic event. She finished last in the semifinal.

Later, the Indian women's 4x400 metre relay team of P. T. Usha, Shiny Abraham, M. D. Valsamma and Vandana Rao made it to the finals. They finished last among the seven teams in the final but set an Asian record of 3:32.49 seconds.

Competitors

Results by event

Athletics

Men Track And Field events

Women Track And Field events

References 

An interview with Shiny Wilson

Nations at the 1984 Summer Olympics
1984